The so-called Kwami-Affair has been caused by Carl Röver, Nazi-Gauleiter of Weser-Ems, and the Free State of Oldenburg, when he attempted to prevent a sermon held by the Ghanaian Pastor Robert Kwami September 20, 1932, in the St. Lamberti Church in the city of Oldenburg.

Robert Kwami, a representative of the Protestant Ewe-Church, had come to Germany in summer 1932. He was invited by the Norddeutsche Missionsgesellschaft in order to hold a lecture tour with sermons in Northern Germany to inform the German people about Christianity in the former German colony of Togoland and to collect donations to support the young African church. Donations had been scarce in the age of depression. 60 events had been planned, but due to the great public interest 150 lectures and sermons were carried out in 82 towns in Lippe, East Frisia, the County of Bentheim and in the Free State of Oldenburg.

By 1932, when in the Supreme Consistory (Oberkirchenrat) of Evangelical Lutheran Church in Oldenburg decided to give permission to use the St. Lambertikirche for the sermon of the African pastor, the Oldenburg free state had already been governed by the NSDAP. Gauleiter Carl Röver, who was also Minister-President of Oldenberg, reacted immediately, directing racist tirades against Kwami, the Norddeutsche Mission and the supreme church council demanding to postpone the sermon. The Nazi-party called upon the State Ministry of Oldenburg to stop the sermon.

The church parish asked Heinrich Tilemann, member of the Oberkirchenrat, for help, who defended the plans of the church.  However, Röver could not be stopped, and in a speech September 16, 1932 incited the members of the Nazi-party to take action. Concerned about the security of Robert Kwami the parish, Oldenburg Pastor Erich Hoyer sent an open letter to 35 German newspapers wherein he accused the Nazi-minister of arousing hatred against the church and the initiators of the sermon, asking for an apology.

In the meantime church councillor Dr. Buck, expecting uproar and violence from the Nazis, asked Oldenburg's mayor Dr. Goerlitz for police protection.

Despite the public threats by the local Nazis, the sermon was carried out as planned September 20, 1932. Robert Kwami, not only fluent in German, but also of German citizenship, held his sermon in the afternoon and a lecture in the evening. The event was a great success. About 2000 people filled the pews of the church, with people waiting in front of the church to listen, to support Kwami, and to encourage the young African pastor. Due to the open letter that Pastor Hoyer had sent to 35 newspapers, the “Kwami-Affair” had become a topic talk not only in Germany. British and Dutch newspapers too covered the event.

See also 
Persecution of black people in Nazi Germany

References

External links 
Die Kwami-Affäre. Brücke für Afrika – Die Norddeutsche Mission (30. August 2011)
Robert Stephen Kwami (1879-1945). Brücke für Afrika – Die Norddeutsche Mission (30. August 2011)
 Sabine Schicke: Kwami-Affäre schreibt Geschichte. In: Nord-Westzeitung. 12. August 2007. (20. August 2011)

History of Protestantism in Germany
1932 in Germany
African diaspora in Germany
Anti-Christian sentiment in Europe
Oldenburg (state)
Anti-black racism in Germany